Tierp Municipality (Tierps kommun) is a municipality in Uppsala County in east central Sweden. Its seat is located in the town of Tierp.

Localities
Localities in Tierp Municipality include:
 Karlholmsbruk 
 Killskär
 Månkarbo 
 Mehedeby 
 Örbyhus 
 Skärplinge 
 Söderfors 
 Tierp (seat) 
 Tobo 
 Upplanda

References

External links

Tierp Municipality - Official site

Municipalities of Uppsala County
Tierps Municipality